The 1896 Florida gubernatorial election was held on October 6, 1896. Democratic nominee William D. Bloxham defeated Republican nominee E. R. Gunby with 66.55% of the vote.

General election

Candidates
Major party candidates
William D. Bloxham, Democratic
E. R. Gunby, Republican

Other candidates
W. A. Wicks, People's

Results

References

1896
Florida
Gubernatorial